The 2023 TCR Australia Series (known for sponsorship reasons as the 2023 Supercheap Auto TCR Australia Series) will be the fourth season of the TCR Australia Touring Car Series. The series will run as part of SpeedSeries. It will also feature two rounds of the TCR World Tour.

Calendar

Teams and Drivers 
The following teams and drivers are under contract to compete in the 2023 championship. Car numbers are presumed to carry over from 2022 unless otherwise stated. Kumho is the new official tire supplier.

Driver Changes 
Kody Garland will switch from driving Renault Mégane R.S TCR to Peugeot 308 TCR.

Zac Soutar will switch from driving Honda Civic Type R TCR (FK8) to Audi RS 3 LMS TCR (2021).

Summary

Driver's standings

Points system
The points system for 2023 was restructured. Races 1 and 3 award maximum points, while race 2, which features a starting grid based on reversed results from race 1, is worth slightly reduced points. Additionally, the top five drivers in qualifying now receive points instead of only the pole winner, and the driver who sets the fastest lap in a race receives points.
 

The driver who sets the fastest lap in a race receives one additional point.

Championship standings

Notes

References

External Links 
 Official website

Australia
TCR Australia
TCR Australia